Selat Lumut Bridge is the longest straits bridge in Klang Valley, Selangor, Malaysia. It connects mainland Port Klang to Pulau Indah.

See also
Federal Route 181 Pulau Indah Expressway

Bridges completed in 1994
1994 establishments in Malaysia
Bridges in Selangor